"Flowerz" is a song by American record producer Armand van Helden featuring vocals from American musician Roland Clark. The song samples from Donald Byrd's 1974 track "Think Twice" from his Stepping into Tomorrow album. "Flowerz" was released on April 19, 1999, as the follow-up single to van Helden's number-one single "You Don't Know Me".

Track listings
UK CD single
 "Flowerz" (radio edit)
 "Flowerz" (12-inch version)
 "Flowerz" (dubstrumental version)

US CD single
 "Flowerz" (radio edit)
 "Summertime"
 "Flowers" (TV track)
 "Flowerz" (original mix)

Charts

Weekly charts

Year-end charts

Release history

References

1999 singles
1998 songs
Armand Van Helden songs
FFRR Records singles
Songs written by Armand Van Helden